Rico Seith (born 31 May 1994 in Karlsruhe) is a German singer, his area of music is Schlager.

Rico grew up in Karlsruhe and with the age of 10, Benjamin Zibret the manager and Schlager Producer of the Bruchsaler Schloßspatzen discovered his unique singing talent. Since then Rico is singing in the group as an Ensemble-Member and Soloist. Within all that, he is also pursuing his solo career as a German Schlager Artist.

Benjamin started building Rico up as a Schlager Artist and also produced his first Maxi-CD Santa Rosa. On 10 August 2008, Rico won first place on the ARD (broadcaster) TV-Show "Immer wieder sonntags" and became the Sommerhit-King 2008, later in the month on 24 August Franziska (last years winner) handed over the Crown of Sommerhit-King to Rico.

Then on 21 May 2009, he won the runner-up at the pre-qualifiers for the Grand Prix der Volksmusik 2009. The sensational Sommerhit Santa Rosa swept away most of the TV Viewers, surely it was not only the title; Ricos young voice has something special – something what moves you. You could say that Rico with his curly hair and his sweet smile is a heart throb at large; he has gained the love and attention of his audience like a storm.

Besides his music he likes to spend his free time with; Gymnastics and riding his Motocross Bike which he named "Suzi".

When he was asked what his plans are for the future, his response was: "To impress people with my singing, and become well known with my music".

Prizes and Nominations 

 Sommerhit-King 2008 on the TV-Show Immer wieder sonntags
 Prize from smago.net, Der Arbeitsgemeinschaft Deutscher Schlager und Volksmusik e. V.
 Runner-Up at the pre-qualifiers for the Grand Prix der Volksmusik 2009
 6th Place at the Finals of the Grand Prix der Volksmusik 2009

Discography
 Maxi-CD: Santa Rosa, 2008
 Album: Ich zeig dir meine Welt. 21 August 2009

External links 
 Homepage This Website has been closed.

Schlager musicians
Musicians from Karlsruhe
1994 births
Living people
21st-century German  male  singers